was a Japanese idol girl group, formed in 2011 and ended in 2020. They were managed by the talent agency Rising Production and produced by the Avex record label Sonic Groove.

History

Pre-debut
Fairies was formed by talent agency Vision Factory (now Rising Production), famous for successful artists such as Namie Amuro, MAX and Speed. Their concept was "a world class talented group that is able to compete overseas." Members were chosen from 100 candidates who were attending dance schools affiliated with Vision Factory, coming from 13 regions of Japan. The group name was open for suggestions from the public through a special corner in Nippon TV programme Sukkiri!!, and "Fairies" was chosen with the explanation that their dancing form resembled a group of fairies fluttering.

The group debuted with the double A-side single "More Kiss / Song for You" on September 21, 2011. At the 53rd Japan Record Awards, held on December 30, 2011, Fairies were named the best newcomer of the year, receiving the Best New Artist award. Among other nominees, they beat 2NE1 and Super Girls. At the time of receiving the award, Fairies' average age of 13.6 was the lowest for this award, a record shared with  that won in 2007.

On January 17, 2013, member Kiyomura announced that she would be "restraining" from activities with Fairies in order to concentrate on her studies, leaving the remaining six to continue. Although the group had been using the name "Fairies" in Latin script until then, from February onwards it was changed to Japanese on all their official sites and single jacket covers. However, no announcement was ever made about which was the official notation. On February 1, 2013 the subunit  with Hayashida Mahiro, Fujita Miria, and Shimomura Miki as members was announced. The name was due to "M" being the initial of all three girls' given names. Their debut single "Yumemiru Dancing Doll" was released on March 27.

Fairies released their eponymous first album on March 26, 2014. Included as a new song on the album was Ito's solo song "Poker Face", which later became the title song on Ito's solo debut single, released July 23. From August 9 to August 14, the group held their first live tour "Fairies LIVE TOUR 2014: Summer Party," which was released on DVD that December.

In January 2017, Fujita Miria announced that she would be withdrawing from the group in order to focus on her studies.

On June 17, 2020, it was announced by Rising Production that after several discussions with the members, Rikako Inoue, Sora Nomoto and Mahiro Hayashida has decided to end their contract with the agency, with Rikako also retiring from the show business. Momoka Ito and Miki Shimomura will remain in the agency working individually. Although the activities ended as a group, the agency revealed that the group have not disbanded and their future activities are "undecided".

Members

Former Members
 (2011-2020)
 (2011-2020)
 (2011-2020)
 (2011-2020)
 (2011-2017)
 (2011-2020)
 (2011-2013)

Timeline

Discography

Albums

Singles

Subunits' and solo singles

M Three

Momoka Ito

Music videos

Awards 

|-
|rowspan=3| 2011
|rowspan=2| Fairies (group)
| Japan Record Awards — New Artist
| 
|-
| Japan Record Awards — Best New Artist
| 
|-
| "More Kiss"
| Japan Cable Awards — New Artist 
| 
|-
|rowspan=3| 2012
|rowspan="2"| "White Angel"
| Japan Record Awards — Gold Award 
| 
|-
| Japan Record Awards — Grand Prix
| 
|-
| "Beat Generation"
| Japan Cable Awards — Excellence Award 
| 
|-

Notes

References

External links 
  

 
Japanese pop music groups
Japanese girl groups
Japanese idol groups
Japanese-language singers
Musical groups established in 2011
Avex Group artists
2011 establishments in Japan
2020 disestablishments in Japan
Musical groups disestablished in 2020
Child musical groups
Musical groups from Tokyo